Sava Athanasiu (28 April 1861 – 8 April 1946) was a Romanian geologist and paleontologist.

Born in Ruginești, Vrancea County, he completed a private high school in Iași, where he was attracted to the natural sciences by his teacher Grigore Cobălcescu. He then entered the natural sciences faculty of the University of Iași, where Cobălcescu continued as his professor. From 1888 to 1892, he was Cobălcescu's assistant at Iași University. Aside from teaching younger students, one of his tasks was to organize the extensive collections his mentor had purchased, with a view to setting up a museum. After the latter's 1892 death, he was selected as a substitute professor. In 1890, he was hired by his former high school, and in 1891, by the Iași commercial school. In 1895, he enrolled in the University of Vienna, where his professors included Eduard Suess and Albrecht Penck. He obtained a doctorate in 1899 regarding geological studies of the northern Carpathians. From 1900 to 1909, he taught at Matei Basarab High School in Bucharest. He was a professor at the University of Bucharest from 1910 to 1936, and also worked at the Romanian Geological Institute from 1906 to 1930. He undertook a wide array of field research, writing numerous books and studies about his discoveries. Elected a corresponding member of the Romanian Academy in June 1920, he was made honorary member in June 1945.

Notes

References

Analele Academiei române, 1921, Academia Română, Bucharest

1861 births
1946 deaths
People from Vrancea County
Romanian geologists
Romanian paleontologists
Romanian schoolteachers
Alexandru Ioan Cuza University alumni
Academic staff of Alexandru Ioan Cuza University
Academic staff of the University of Bucharest
Honorary members of the Romanian Academy
Members of the Romanian Academy of Sciences